Anacleto José María Peña Salegui (19 April 1895 – 13 January 1988) was a Spanish professional football player and manager. Born in Las Arenas, he started playing football at Arenas Club de Getxo as a midfielder. He played for Spain at the 1924 Summer Olympics.

He became famous after he moved to Madrid and signed with Real Madrid CF. He played for the club for 6 years, from 1926 to 1932. During his career he won 4 regional  championships and played 21 times for Spain national football team.

Peña was also a talented athlete who achieved a silver medal in the 400 metres event at the 1918 edition of the Spanish Athletics Championships, while in the 1923 edition he got silver in the Javelin throw and bronze in the 200 metres, 110 metres hurdles and 4 × 400 metres relay. In 1925 he won the gold in 400 metres hurdles and 4 × 400 metres relay, and in 1926 a gold in 110 metres hurdles and bronze in 4 × 400 metres relay.

References

External links

 Jose María Peña at Real Madrid

1895 births
1988 deaths
Footballers from Getxo
Spanish footballers
Spanish male sprinters
Arenas Club de Getxo footballers
Real Madrid CF players
Spain international footballers
Spanish football managers
RC Celta de Vigo managers
Real Oviedo managers
Gimnástica de Torrelavega managers
Arenas Club de Getxo managers
Sporting de Gijón managers
CA Osasuna managers
Barakaldo CF managers
Association football midfielders
La Liga players
La Liga managers
Segunda División managers
Olympic footballers of Spain
Footballers at the 1924 Summer Olympics
Basque Country international footballers